Bocchoris may refer to:

In history
 Bakenranef, known by the ancient Greeks as Bocchoris, a king of the twenty-fourth dynasty of Egypt
 Bocchoris (city), an ancient city in northern Majorca, Spain, that was federated to Rome

In zoology
 Bocchoris (moth), a genus of moths of the family Crambidae